Gangmumei Kamei (21 October 1939 – 5 January 2017) was a notable Indian historian and scholar of Manipur. He was also a politician in his later career, and served as a minister in the Government of Manipur.

Academic career
Kamei was born in Imphal, and taught history at Manipur University. He was regarded as an expert on the history of Manipur.

Books:
 A History of Modern Manipur (1826-2000) 
 A History of Manipur: Pre-colonial Period 
 On History and Historiography of Manipur 
 History of Zeliangrong Nagas: From Makhel to Rani Gaidinliu 
 Ethnicity and Social Change 
 Lectures on History of Manipur

Role:
 Professor of History in Manipur University 
 Elected president of the Northeast India History Association (NEIHA) in its Kohima session of 1986
 President of the Manipur History Society 
 Coordinator of the Centre for Manipuri Studies & Tribal Research of Manipur University
 Member of the Advisory Committee of the Anthropological Survey of India (1984–87) 
 Member of the ICSSR panel on Tribal Studies
 In 2010 he was awarded the Platinum Jubilee Samman by the Manipuri Sahitya Parishad for his contribution to history and tribal culture
 Awarded a National Fellowship by Indian Institute of Advanced Study, Shimla in 2010-2012

Political career
Gangmumei Kamei was the founding president of the Federal Party of Manipur which was formed in the year 1993. He was elected as a Member of the Legislative Assembly in the year 1995 and again in 2001 Manipur Assembly. He was the minister for Forest, Environment and Higher Education and has held important portfolios in the then Manipur Government led by Shri Nipamcha Singh in 1998 and 2001. Kamei joined the Bharatiya Janata Party in 2012 and contested the outer Manipur Lok Sabha Constituency. However, he lost and later led development of party policy. Kamei held membership in the Indian Council of Historical Research (ICHR) and the Regional Planning Body of the North Eastern Council (NEC).

Death 
He died on 5 January 2017, aged 77.

References

1939 births
2017 deaths
Naga people
Local historians
20th-century Indian historians
21st-century Indian historians
People from Imphal
National Democratic Alliance candidates in the 2014 Indian general election
Bharatiya Janata Party politicians from Manipur
Manipur MLAs 1995–2000
Manipur MLAs 2000–2002